Carlos Forcadell Álvarez (born 1946) is a Spanish historian, Professor Emeritus of Contemporary History of the University of Zaragoza (UNIZAR). The scope of his academic research includes the history of the labor movement in Spain, the public use of history, political cultures in Spain, historiography as well as the history of Aragon.

Biography 
Born on 26 March 1946 in Zaragoza, Forcadell earned a licentiate degree in from the University of Zaragoza in 1969. He took post-graduate studies at Heidelberg University. Following his return to Spain in 1974, he obtained a PhD in 1977, reading a dissertation titled El movimiento obrero español durante la Gran Guerra. A senior lecturer at the University of the Basque Country (UPV) and UNIZAR, he was promoted to a Chair in Contemporary History at UNIZAR in 1990. He retired in 2016.

Works 

Author

References 
Citations

Bibliography
 
 

20th-century Spanish historians
Academic staff of the University of Zaragoza
1946 births
Living people
University of Zaragoza alumni
Heidelberg University alumni
Historians of the labour movement in Spain
21st-century Spanish historians